Calochortus spatulatus is a Mexican species of plants in the lily family. It is widespread across much of Mexico from Sonora and Chihuahua south as far as Oaxaca.

Calochortus spatulatus is a bulb-forming herb up to 40 cm tall, sometimes branched, sometimes not. Flowers are purple, oriented horizontally or sometimes nodding (hanging downward).

References

External links
Pacific Bulb Society Calochortus Species Six photos of several species
Flickr photos
SEINet, Arizona Chapter, Calochortus spatulatus S.Watson 

spatulatus
Endemic flora of Mexico
Plants described in 1879